Lieutenant Colonel James Edward Knight TD JP, (1867 – 9 June 1930) was an English Architect based in Rotherham.

He was the son of Henry John Knight (1837–1899) and Alice Ann Barton (1839–1924). 

He served in the 2nd Volunteer Battalion of the York and Lancaster Regiment, and was promoted to second lieutenant on 25 May 1898 and major on 1 April 1908. He was awarded the Territorial Decoration in 1918. He retired from military service in 1921 and was promoted to lieutenant colonel.

After his death in 1930, the company continued trading as James E Knight and Co with John Lawton and Arnold Ewart Hollely until 1943, when the partnership was dissolved.

Works

References

20th-century English architects
1867 births
1930 deaths
People from Rotherham
Architects from Yorkshire
York and Lancaster Regiment officers